Jürgen Wolf (born 9 November 1952) is a German former cross-country skier. He competed in the men's 15 kilometre event at the 1976 Winter Olympics.

References

External links
 

1952 births
Living people
German male cross-country skiers
Olympic cross-country skiers of East Germany
Cross-country skiers at the 1976 Winter Olympics
People from Mittelsachsen
Sportspeople from Saxony